Raffaele Di Fusco (born 6 October 1961 in Riardo) is an Italian former professional football coach and a former player who played as a goalkeeper. In 2008 he became goalkeeping coach with Aurora Pro Patria 1919.

Honours
Napoli
 Serie A: 1986–87, 1989–90.
 Coppa Italia: 1986–87.
 UEFA Cup: 1988–89.

Torino
 Coppa Italia: 1992–93.

References

1961 births
Living people
Italian footballers
Association football goalkeepers
Serie A players
Serie B players
L.R. Vicenza players
S.S.C. Napoli players
U.S. Catanzaro 1929 players
Torino F.C. players
Italian football managers
UEFA Cup winning players